The Frisian waterline started being built around 1580. The defence line goes from the Zuidersea, along the River Linde, to the De Blesse Bridge. Then, the defence line goes northward to Kuinre by way of Heerenveen, Terband, Gorredijk, Donkerbroek, Bakkeveen and Frieschepalen.

The area along the forts had dams flooded during the Eighty Years' War against the Spanish and in 1672 Rampjaar (Disaster Year) against Bernard von Galen and the French troops who were the bishop of Munster.

In the east, the defence line is connected to the Groninger waterlinie, which continues to Delfzijl.

Part of the defence line is also called the Tjonger-Lindelinie.

The ten schansen were in Schoterland nearby Oudehorne, just north of the River Tjonger, near Oudeschoot, along the road to Wolvega and nearby Terbant. The defence line is currently under restoration.

The defence line contains thezse forts:
Sterrenschans (nearby Bakkeveen)
Zwartendijksterschans 
Breebergschans
Schans Frieschepalen
Makkingaasterschans
Bekhofschans
Kuinderschans
Sliekenborgschans
Blessebergeschans
Tolbrugschans

See also
Dutch waterlines
Old / New Dutch Waterline
Grebbe line
IJssel Line
Maas Line
Peel-Raam Line
Other
Defence lines of the Netherlands

References

External link
 
 Movie about the Frisian Water Line (Dutch) on YouTube

Military history of the Netherlands
History of Friesland
Forts in the Netherlands
Buildings and structures in Friesland